Charles Francis Dorr Belden (October 5, 1870 – October 24, 1931) was an American librarian. He was a chairman of the Free Public Library Commission of Massachusetts and a former State Librarian of Massachusetts. A native of Syracuse, New York, Belden moved to Cambridge, Massachusetts in 1891 to pursue his education.

He graduated from Harvard University in 1895 and from Harvard Law School in 1898. He was secretary to the faculty of the Harvard Law School until appointed assistant librarian of the Harvard Law School in 1902. In September 1908, he resigned from the law school to become the librarian for the Social Law Library in Boston. In June, 1909, he was appointed State Librarian of Massachusetts and a member of the Free Public Library Commission. Belden was elected Librarian of the Boston Public Library on January 26, 1917.

Belden served as president of the American Library Association from 1925 to 1926. He was also active during World War I with the Library War Service (1917–19). Belden was a fellow of the American Library Institute, vice-president of the League of Library Commissions, and served as president of the National Association of State Libraries. He was married with two daughters (Elizabeth and Alison) and a son, Lawrence Putnam Belden.

References

External links
 

 

1870 births
1931 deaths
American librarians
Presidents of the American Library Association
Harvard Law School alumni
Librarians of the Boston Public Library